is a German classical pianist.

Early life and education
Alice was born in Munich, Germany, in 1988. Her Japanese mother had studied piano in Tokyo; her father was a German civil engineer. She says she realised as a child that "music was the language that goes much beyond any words" and that she wanted to communicate and express herself through music. Ott started piano lessons at the age of four. At age five she reached the final stage of the youth competition in Munich, playing to a full house in the Hercules Hall. At age seven she won the Jugend musiziert competition in Germany. In 2002, Ott was the youngest finalist at the Hamamatsu International Piano Academy Competition in Japan where she won the Most Promising Artist award. From the age of twelve, she studied at the Salzburg Mozarteum with Karl-Heinz Kämmerling while continuing her school education in Munich. Ott has won awards at a number of piano competitions, including first prize at the 2004 Pianello Val Tidone Competition.

Her younger sister Mona Asuka Ott is also a classical pianist.

In February 2019, Ott announced on Instagram that she had been diagnosed with multiple sclerosis.

Career
Ott has made recordings for Deutsche Grammophon and performs regularly in concert tours in Europe, Japan, and the United States. She won first prize in the 2003 Bach Competition in Köthen, the 2004 Pianello Val Tidone Competition in Italy, and the 4th EPTA (European Piano Teachers Association) International Competition in 2005.

Recordings
Ott has a recording contract with Deutsche Grammophon and her recordings include:
2009 – Liszt: Études d'exécution transcendante
2010 – Chopin: Complete Waltzes
2010 – Liszt: Piano Concerto No. 1 and Tchaikovsky: Piano Concerto No. 1
2011 – Beethoven: Piano sonatas No.3 in C, Op.2 No.3 and No.21 in C, Op.53 (Waldstein)
2013 – Mussorgsky: Pictures at an Exhibition and Schubert: Piano Sonata in D major, D8502014 – Scandale (with Francesco Tristano) – Tristano: A Soft Shell Groove; Stravinsky: The Rite of Spring; Rimsky-Korsakoff: Scheherazade – The Story of the Kalendar Prince; Ravel: La Valse2015 – The Chopin Project (with Ólafur Arnalds)
2016 – Wonderland. Edvard Grieg : 
Piano Concerto In A Minor, Op.16; 
Lyric Pieces Book I, Op.12, Album Leaf; Elves' Dance;  Book III, Op.43, Butterfly; To Spring;  Book V, Op.54, March Of The Trolls; Notturno;  Book VII, Op.62, Brooklet;  Book VIII, Op.65, Ballad; Wedding Day At Troldhaugen;  Book X, Op.71, Once Upon A Time; 
Peer Gynt Suite No.1, Op.46, In The Hall Of The Mountain King; Peer Gynt Suite No.2, Op.55, Solveig's Song
2018 – NightfallClaude Debussy
Rêverie, L. 68;
Suite bergamasque, L. 75 1. Prelude 2. Menuet 3. Clair de lune 4. Passepied
Erik Satie
Gnossiennes: No. 1 (Lent), No. 3 (Lent);
Gymnopédies: No. 1 (Lent et douloureux)
Maurice Ravel
Gaspard de la Nuit, M. 55 1. Ondine 2. Le Gibet 3. Scarbo
Pavane pour une infante défunte, M. 19
2021 - Echoes of Life''
Frédéric Chopin: Preludes, Op. 28 
Francesco Tristano: In The Beginning Was
György Ligeti: Musica ricercata I. Sostenuto. Misurato. Prestissimo.
Nino Rota: Valzer
Jason Beck: Prelude in C Sharp Major
Toru Takemitsu: Litany (In Memory of Michael Vyner)
Arvo Pärt: Für Alina
Alice Sara Ott: Lullaby to Eternity (on fragments of W.A. Mozart's "Lacrimosa")

References

External links
 
Deutsche Grammophon bio

1988 births
Musicians from Munich
German classical pianists
German women pianists
Living people
Deutsche Grammophon artists
German people of Japanese descent
Women classical pianists
21st-century classical pianists
21st-century German musicians
People with multiple sclerosis
21st-century German women
21st-century women pianists